The Roman Catholic Diocese of Encarnación is a diocese located in the city of Encarnación in the Ecclesiastical province of Asunción in Paraguay.

History
 On January 21, 1957, the Territorial Prelature of Encarnación y Alto Paraná was established from the Diocese of Concepción and Diocese of Villarrica
 On March 25, 1968, the territorial prelature was renamed as the Territorial Prelature of Encarnación
 On April 19, 1990: Promoted as Diocese of Encarnación

Bishops

Ordinaries, in reverse chronological order
 Bishops of Encarnación (Roman rite), below
 Bishop Francisco Javier Pistilli Scorzara, P. Schönstatt (November 15, 2014 – present)
 Bishop Ignacio Gogorza Izaguirre, S.C.I. (July 12, 2004 – November 15, 2014)
 Bishop Jorge Adolfo Carlos Livieres Banks (April 19, 1990 – July 5, 2003)
 Prelates of Encarnación (Roman Rite), below
 Bishop Jorge Adolfo Carlos Livieres Banks (July 24, 1987 – April 19, 1990)
 Bishop Juan Bockwinckel, S.V.D. (May 11, 1968 – July 24, 1987)
 Bishop Johannes Wiesen, S.V.D. (January 21, 1957 – March 1, 1972)

Auxiliary bishop
Claudio Silvero Acosta, S.C.I. di Béth. (26 Mar 1998 - 15 Nov 2014)

References
 GCatholic.org
 Catholic Hierarchy

Roman Catholic dioceses in Paraguay
Christian organizations established in 1957
Roman Catholic dioceses and prelatures established in the 20th century
Encarnacion, Roman Catholic Diocese of
Itapúa Department
1957 establishments in Paraguay